Hieracium attenboroughianum, or Attenborough's hawkweed, is a species of hawkweed in the genus Hieracium, found only in the Brecon Beacons in south Wales. It was named after the naturalist Sir David Attenborough by taxonomist Tim Rich, who said:

Rich was one of the team that first discovered the species, in 2004.

The species is classified is a member of the H. britannicum group in Hieracium section Stelligera Zahn. It is related to H. britannicoides (P. D. Sell), but differs in having in cupped, dark green leaves and sparse, medium simple eglandular hairs and many glandular hairs on the involucral bracts.

Only around 300 plants occur on Old Red Sandstone mountain ledges on Cribyn.

See also
 List of things named after David Attenborough and his works

References

attenboroughianum
Plants described in 2015
Flora of Wales
Endemic flora of Wales
Brecon Beacons
David Attenborough